Serena is the surname of:

 Aldo Serena (born 1960), Italian footballer
 Bill Serena (1924–1996), American Major League Baseball player
 Fernando Serena (1941–2018), Spanish footballer
 Gustavo Serena (1881–1970), Italian actor and film director
 Michele Serena (born 1970), Italian football manager and former player
 Ottavio Serena (1837–1914), Italian politician, judge, prefect, and historian